Heliobolus lugubris, also known commonly as the bushveld lizard, mourning racerunner, or the black and yellow sand lizard, is a species of lizard in the family Lacertidae. The species is found in Southern Africa: southern Angola, Namibia, Botswana, southwestern Zimbabwe, southern Mozambique, and south-central to northern South Africa.

Mimicry
Juveniles of H. lugubris are black with light spots and move with a hunched gait, mimicking the appearance of Anthia ground beetles.  This mimicry is thought to discourage predation, as the beetles spray formic acid as a defense mechanism and are thus less appealing targets for predators.  This is one of very few recorded examples of a vertebrate mimicking an invertebrate.

References

Further reading
Branch, Bill (2004). Field Guide to Snakes and other Reptiles of Southern Africa. Third Revised edition, Second impression. Sanibel Island, Florida: Ralph Curtis Books. 399 pp. . (Heliobolus lugubris, p. 161 + Plate 57).

Heliobolus
Lacertid lizards of Africa
Reptiles of Angola
Reptiles of Botswana
Reptiles of Mozambique
Reptiles of Namibia
Reptiles of South Africa
Reptiles of Zimbabwe
Taxa named by Andrew Smith (zoologist)
Reptiles described in 1838